Denis Pronovost (born 3 May 1953) was a member of the House of Commons of Canada from 1988 to 1993.

Early career
He was born in Grand-Mère, Quebec and was a local radio host and journalist.

Federal politics
Pronovost ran as a Progressive Conservative candidate in the district of Saint-Maurice in 1988 and was elected.  He was the first member of his party to be sent to the House of Commons by voters of that district in decades.

Footnotes

External links

1953 births
Living people
Members of the House of Commons of Canada from Quebec
People from Mauricie
Progressive Conservative Party of Canada MPs